Three Hollywood Girls is a 1931 American comedy film directed by Fatty Arbuckle (billed as William Goodrich) and starring Leota Lane.

Cast
 Leota Lane
 Edward J. Nugent 
 Florence Oberle
 Phyllis Crane
  Rita Flynn
 Ford West

See also
 Fatty Arbuckle filmography

External links

1931 films
1931 comedy films
1931 short films
Films directed by Roscoe Arbuckle
American black-and-white films
Educational Pictures short films
American comedy short films
Films with screenplays by Jack Townley
1930s English-language films
1930s American films